Robert Fleming & Co. was an asset manager and merchant bank founded in Dundee, Scotland, in 1873. In 1909, the firm moved its headquarters to London, England. It was sold to Chase Manhattan Bank for over $7 billion in 2000. Flemings was a 50% partner in the Asian investment bank Jardine Fleming.

History
The firm of Robert Fleming & Co., known as Flemings, was founded in Dundee, Scotland in 1873 by Robert Fleming, a successful manufacturer of jute fabrics used for sandbags in the American Civil War.  The firm was originally formed as a series of investment trusts, pooling money from Scottish investors into overseas ventures, and later moved into merchant banking.  In 1909 the firm moved its headquarters to London.

In 1873, Robert Fleming cofounded the Scottish American Investment Company for the purpose of investing in high risk, high return American railroad bonds. Flemings assumed a central role in the 1886 battle with Jay Gould for control of the Texas & Pacific Railway, in which the Flemings bondholder group ultimately triumphed.  Overall, Flemings claimed to have made a 40% return on investments in US railroads.

In 1970, Flemings entered into an investment banking joint venture with Hong Kong-based Jardine Matheson, forming Jardine Fleming.

Despite restructuring, Flemings saw its investment banking and asset management market share decline in the 1990s as global investment banks like Morgan Stanley and Lazard moved into their markets.

The Fleming name was tarnished by a scandal in 1996, when Jardine Fleming was ordered to pay $19 million to fund investors for alleged abusive and unsupervised securities allocation practices by is asset management division.

In April 2000, Robert Flemings Holdings was sold to Chase Manhattan Bank for $7.7 billion. Although the sale came about as partially as a result of Flemings’ weakened position, it was part of two larger trends: consolidation in the financial services industry as large US commercial banks acquired investment banks upon the repeal of the Glass–Steagall Act, and the sale of UK merchant banks to foreign banks. Flemings, with almost no US assets, was considered a particularly good fit for increasingly globally minded Chase, whose assets lay largely in the United States. In the sale about 130 Fleming family members pocketed approximately $2.3 billion for their thirty percent stake. When Chase merged with J.P. Morgan & Co. in 2001, the Flemings asset management business was rebranded J.P. Morgan Fleming, and Fleming Premier Banking was sold to Abbey National's Cater Allen subsidiary.

Members of the Fleming family set up an asset management company, Fleming Family & Partners, which in November 2014 merged with Stonehage Group, an international family office with its roots in South Africa, to create Stonehage Fleming Family and Partners.

References

External links

 The Fleming Collection 
 Spinprofiles Robert Fleming and Co.

British companies established in 1873
1873 establishments in Scotland
Companies based in Dundee
Financial services companies based in the City of London
History of Dundee
JPMorgan Chase
Jardine Matheson Group
Former investment banks
Financial services companies of Scotland
Defunct companies of Scotland
Defunct financial services companies of the United Kingdom
Financial services companies disestablished in 2000
Investment management companies of the United Kingdom
Banks established in 1873
Banks disestablished in 2000
Financial services companies established in 1873
2000 disestablishments in England